Rudolf Rehák (born 26 December 1965) is a retired Slovak football defender.

References

1965 births
Living people
Slovak footballers
FK Inter Bratislava players
FK Dukla Banská Bystrica players
FC Hradec Králové players
FC Admira Wacker Mödling players
SV Schwechat players
ASK Schwadorf players
Czech First League players
Association football defenders
Slovak expatriate footballers
Expatriate footballers in the Czech Republic
Slovak expatriate sportspeople in the Czech Republic
Expatriate footballers in Austria
Slovak expatriate sportspeople in Austria
FK Dukla Banská Bystrica managers
Slovak football managers
Footballers from Bratislava